Left Hand Brewing Company is a craft brewery located in Longmont, Colorado.

History

Left Hand began in December 1990 with a homebrewing kit founder Dick Doore received from his brother. According to Doore, "it was all downhill from there." By 1993, Doore had teamed up with college buddy Eric Wallace and they resolved to start a brewery.

On September 21, 1993, they incorporated as Indian Peaks Brewing Company, and purchased a former meat-packing plant next to the St. Vrain River outside downtown Longmont, Colorado. A few weeks after beginning production, it was discovered that the name Indian Peaks was already in use by another Brewery, so the name was changed to Left Hand, in honor of Chief Niwot (the Arapahoe word for "left hand") whose tribe wintered in the local area.

Left Hand's doors opened for business on January 22, 1994. Their first batch of beer was Sawtooth Ale In October of that year. Left Hand took home two medals at the Great American Beer Festival, a Gold Medal in the bitter category for Sawtooth Ale, and a Bronze Medal in the Robust Porter category for Black Jack Porter. In 1995, the brewery was able to start putting its logo on bottle caps. But when it came down to shrinking down the original logo to put on a crown, the design was illegible. Left Hand created a small hand to be the logo. It morphed into a sticker, and eventually into the company logo used today.

In April 1998, Left Hand merged with Tabernash Brewing, and doubled the size of their brewery. In June, they began packaging 12 oz. bottles for 6 packs (up to that point they had been bottling 22 oz. bottles and kegs exclusively). In November, they started their own distribution business, Indian Peaks Distribution Company. Tabernash was phased out and Indian Peaks Distribution Company was sold, allowing Left Hand to focus and redirect their energy back to brewing.

In recent years, the brewery has experience significant growth. With over 30% growth in 2010, Left Hand has steadily increased its production, making the Brewers Association’s Top 50 Craft Brewers list in 2012. The brewery has added six 480 barrel fermenters, an additional 500 barrel bright tank, and a new KHS keg line. Left Hand has also expanded the brewery property, purchasing the warehouse across Boston Avenue to house offices as well as the site of a new 6,000 square foot cooler, bringing the total brewery acreage to 5.5 acres. In the fall of 2012, Left Hand opened a new bottling line that runs four times faster than their previous system and fills 200 bottles per minute.

On the first night of the 2011 Great American Beer Festival, Left Hand introduced Milk Stout Nitro in a bottle, which has become their most popular beer, making it both the first American and the first craft brewery to bottle a nitrogenated beer without a widget. Two years later, Left Hand expanded the bottled Nitro series with Sawtooth Nitro and Wake Up Dead Nitro.

Left Hand produced approximately 65,879 barrels in 2013.

Bottled Beers

Perennial Collection:
 Sawtooth Ale
 Travelin' Light
 Milk Stout
 Milk Stout Nitro
 Extrovert IPA
 Polestar Pilsner
 Black Jack Porter
 Introvert IPA
 Wake Up Dead Nitro

Seasonal Collection:
 Good Juju
 Oktoberfest
 Fade to Black
 Hard Wired Nitro Coffee Porter 
 Well Played Red IPA
 Braveheart Nitro

Big Mo Series (all 22 oz):
 Oak Aged Wake Up Dead
 Chainsaw Double ESB
 Twin Sisters Double IPA
 Smokejumper Imperial Smoked Porter
 Warrior IPA  
 St. Vrain Tripel
 Widdershins Oak Aged Barleywine
 Wake Up Dead Imperial Stout

Ambidextrous Ale Series (Draft Only):
 Step One: Imperial Milk Stout
 Step Two: Smoked Doppelbock
 Step Three: Great Juju
 Step Four: Maibock 
 Step Five: Sticke Alt

Safety Round Series (Draft Only):
 Round One: Belgian Pale Ale
 Round Two: Copper Ale

Collaborations (all 22 oz):
 TerraRye'ZD (2008)
 Depth Charge (2009)
 Oxymoron (2010)
 Peaotch (2011)

Discontinued Beers:
 Motherlode Golden Ale
 Jackman's Pale Ale
 Haystack Wheat
 Deep Cover Brown Ale
 Snowbound Winter Ale
 XXXmas Ale
 Fade to Black Vol. 1 (Foreign Export Stout)
 Fade to Black Vol. 2 (Smoked Baltic Porter)
 Fade to Black Vol. 3 (Pepper Porter)
 Fade to Black Vol. 4 (Rocky Mountain Black Ale)
 TNT Weizen Doppelbock
 Rye Bock Lager
 Smoked Goosinator Doppelbock

Note: all active beers are available in 6 packs of 12 oz bottles unless otherwise noted.

Awards

See also
 Barrel-aged beer

References

External links
Left Hand Official website
Left Hand 2009 GABF Winner
'Friday Field Trip: Left Hand Brewing Company' video by Draft Magazine
Fade to Black feat. in Denver Post
Daily Camera Article

Beer brewing companies based in Colorado
Companies based in Colorado
Longmont, Colorado